Krishnayya or Krishnaiah (Teluguaya)

 Samatam Krishnayya, was a poet, historian and ayurvedic doctor.
 N. V. Krishnaiah, was a communist politician from Andhra Pradesh, India. 
 R. Krishnaiah or Ryaga Krishnaiah, is a leader of Andhra Pradesh Backward Castes.
 Intlo Ramayya Veedilo Krishnayya is a 1982 Tollywood film.

Andhra Pradesh-related lists
Hindu given names
Indian given names
Telugu names
Telugu given names
Masculine given names
Indian masculine given names